LS4 Radio Continental is an Argentine News and Talk radio station. Radio Continental was founded on September 28, 1969 under the name Radio Porteña.

It is considered one of the most effective radio stations in Buenos Aires. It also has many affiliates throughout the country.

The station is owned by Grupo Santamartah.

History
The station started its broadcast on September 28, 1969 on the frequency of 590 on the AM band replacing Radio Porteña, originally from its predecessor set up in 1933.

Television producer Televisión Federal S.A, originating in Buenos Aires, acquired the station in the latter years.

In January 2021, Argentine businessman Carlos Rosales, owner of Grupo Santamartah, acquired the station, along with LOS40, from its longtime owner, Grupo PRISA, to rent the ownership.

The SIC
The Servicio Informativo Continental (Continental Information Service), much better known as SIC, is a three-minute news bulletin that comes on every hour including traffic and weather, along with 2 "Panoramas" at 08:00 and 12:00.

Programming
From Monday to Friday, the following programs are aired in the station:
 ¡Antes Imposible! (Before Impossible!), hosted by Marcelo Pinto.
 Pulso Continental (Continental Pulse), hosted by Eduardo Serenellini.
 Bonadeo en su salsa (Bonadeo in its sauce), hosted by Gonzalo Bonadeo.
 Bravo.Continental, hosted by Fernando Bravo.
 Regreso a casa (Homecoming), hosted by Diego Schurman.
 Sacá del medio (Get out of the middle), hosted by Diego Diaz.
 Ventana abierta (Open window), hosted by Diego Corbalán.
 Ya fué , hosted by Gastón Ibañez.
 Trasnoche Continental (Continental Late night), hosted by Germán Caballero.

See also
 Telefe, Radio Continental's Television partner.

References

External links
Radio Continental's official website

Radio stations in Argentina
Radio stations established in 1969
1969 establishments in Argentina
News and talk radio stations
Mass media in Buenos Aires